The 1964 Giro d'Italia was the 47th running of the Giro d'Italia, one of cycling's Grand Tour races. The Giro started in Bolzano, on 16 May, with a  mass-start stage and concluded back in Milan, on 7 June, with a  leg. A total of 130 riders from 13 teams entered the 22-stage race, which was won by Frenchman Jacques Anquetil of the Saint-Raphaël team. The second and third places were taken by Italian riders Italo Zilioli and Guido De Rosso, respectively.

Teams

A total of 13 teams were invited to participate in the 1964 Giro d'Italia. Each team sent a squad of ten riders, so the Giro began with a peloton of 130 cyclists. Out of the 130 riders that started this edition of the Giro d'Italia, a total of 97 riders made it to the finish in Milan.

The 13 teams that took part in the race were:

Route and stages

The race route was revealed to the public on 31 March 1964 by race director Vincenzo Torriani.

Classification leadership

One jersey was worn during the 1963 Giro d'Italia. The leader of the general classification – calculated by adding the stage finish times of each rider – wore a pink jersey. This classification is the most important of the race, and its winner is considered as the winner of the Giro.

The mountains classification leader. The climbs were ranked in first and second categories. In this ranking, points were won by reaching the summit of a climb ahead of other cyclists. There were two categories of mountains. The first category awarded 50, 30, and 20 points and the second distributed 30, 20, and 10 points. Although no jersey was awarded, there was also one classification for the teams, in which the teams were awarded points for their rider's performance during the stages.

Final standings

General classification

Mountains classification

Traguardi tricolori classification

Teams classification

References

Citations

1964
Giro d'Italia
Giro d'Italia
Giro d'Italia
Giro d'Italia
1964 Super Prestige Pernod